South Gyle (pronounced ) is an area of Edinburgh, Scotland, lying on the western edge of the city and to the south and west of an area of former marshland once known as the Gogarloch, on the edge of Corstorphine. Most of the buildings in the area are of recent origin, dating from the later 1980s, 1990s and early 21st century, with the exception of some farm workers' cottages and an early 1970s council estate abutting South Gyle railway station.

South Gyle can be neatly divided into two main zones – a residential one, incorporating Gogarloch and the neighbouring area centred on South Gyle Mains; and a commercial/business one which incorporates the Gyle Shopping Centre, Edinburgh Park, Gyle Park (an actual park, but with some shopping centres near it), and South Gyle Crescent. The Royal Bank of Scotland and sportscotland are all based in this district. The Lochside development also features a number of busts of Scottish poets.

Etymology
"Gyle", which is pronounced with a hard "g", is of uncertain etymology. It has been suggested that it comes from an old Gaelic word "goill" meaning a "bog", which would make sense given the former Gogar Loch in the area.

This is incorporated in some street names in that area.

Transport
Edinburgh Airport is nearby at Ingliston, and also close is the city bypass (A720), connecting to several major routes into the city.

South Gyle has two branch railway stations: South Gyle station is on the line between Edinburgh and Fife, and Edinburgh Park station provides services to Edinburgh, Stirling and Dunblane and to Bathgate.

Lothian Buses services 2, 12, 21, 22, 36 & Skylink 400 and McGill's Scotland East services 20, 63 & 68 serve the area.

Edinburgh Trams serve the area with stops at Bankhead, Edinburgh Park Station, Edinburgh Park Central (Lochside) and The Gyle Shopping centre.

North of the Gogar Roundabout, the Edinburgh Gateway Interchange opened in December 2016. It connects trains from Fife with the tram to and from the airport. A subway under the busy A8 provides access to the Gyle Shopping Centre.

Government
The Scottish Prison Service has its headquarters in South Gyle.

Education
The area is served by Gylemuir Primary School, on Wester Broom Place. The closest secondary schools are St Augustine's RC High School and Forrester High School.

Political ward
Drum Brae/Gyle is the name of a political ward within the Edinburgh West UK Parliament Constituency and the Edinburgh Western Scottish Parliament constituency.

Notable residents
 Andrew & George Combe, 18th Century phrenologists, who lived at Redheughs during childhood.
 William Neill lived here towards the end of the 1960s.

References
 Bell, Raymond MacKean Literary Corstorphine: A reader's guide to West Edinburgh, Leamington Books, Edinburgh 2017
 Cant, Michael, Villages of Edinburgh volumes 1 & 2, John Donald Publishers Ltd., Edinburgh, 1986-1987.  & 
 Cosh, Mary Edinburgh the Golden Age (2003), Birlinn, Edinburgh
 Grant, James, Old and new Edinburgh''' volumes 1–3 (or 1–6, edition dependent), Cassell, 1880s (published as a periodical): Online edition
 Harris, Stuart (1996). The Place Names of Edinburgh. Edinburgh: Gordon Wright Publishing. p. 144. .
 Wall, Ian Twelve Poets at Edinburgh Park'' (2005)
 RBS moving out of Drummond House, The Edinburgh Reporter:

External links

 The Gyle Shopping Centre

Areas of Edinburgh
Industrial parks in the United Kingdom